Elphinstone Reef (also known as Sha'ab Abu Hamra) is a standalone reef in the Egyptian Red Sea situated about 30 kilometers north from the town of Marsa Alam in Egypt. The coral community in this reef is primarily composed of soft corals such as Dendronephthya species.

Gallery

References

 

Reefs of the Red Sea
Underwater diving sites in Egypt